Muyang may be,

Muyang language
Cheng Muyang